Russellville is the name of several communities in the United States:
Russellville, Alabama
Russellville, Arkansas
Russellville, Georgia
Russellville, Illinois
Russellville, Boone County, Illinois
Russellville, Indiana
Russellville, Kentucky
Russellville, Missouri
Russellville, Ray County, Missouri
Russellville, Ohio
Russellville, Pennsylvania
Russellville, South Carolina
Russellville, Tennessee
Russellville, West Virginia